Edward Norton is an American actor and filmmaker. He made his film debut in the film Primal Fear (1996), for which he earned an Academy Award nomination for Best Supporting Actor and a Golden Globe Award in the same category. In the same year, he starred in two other films, Everyone Says I Love You and The People vs. Larry Flynt. In 1998, Norton featured in American History X, in which he played a neo-Nazi who served three years in prison and ultimately revamped his ideology. His performance was critically lauded and earned him an Academy Award nomination for Best Actor. For the David Fincher-directed film Fight Club (1999), Norton starred in a role that required him learning boxing, taekwondo and grappling. Though initially fiercely debated by critics, Fight Club gradually received critical reappraisal and earned its status as a cult film.

Norton had his directorial debut with the romantic comedy Keeping the Faith (2000), in which he also starred as a main role. He later played Will Graham, an FBI agent in the film Red Dragon (2002), which received mixed critical reviews but was commercially successful. Controversies surrounded Norton's role and participation in the superhero film The Incredible Hulk (2008), for which he rewrote the script every day but without credit. The film was a critical success compared to its 2003 predecessor, but Norton refused to reprise his role for the film The Avengers (2012) and all following Marvel Cinematic Universe (MCU) projects, allegedly due to conflicts between him and other producers. Norton also handled production for several films, including the documentary By the People: The Election of Barack Obama (2010) and romantic comedy Thanks for Sharing (2012). In 2014, he starred in two Academy Award-nominated films, The Grand Budapest Hotel and Birdman. For the latter role, he earned his second Academy Award nomination for Best Supporting Actor, and his third nomination overall.

Film

Television

Video games

Music videos

See also
 List of awards and nominations received by Edward Norton

References

External links
 
 

Male actor filmographies
Director filmographies
American filmographies